Alexia Manombe-Ncube is a Namibian politician. She is Deputy Minister of Disabled People since March 2015.

Manombe-Ncube holds a Diploma in Community Social Development. She has been a member of Parliament as a SWAPO backbencher since 2005.

References

Living people
People from Otjozondjupa Region
Members of the National Assembly (Namibia)
Women members of the National Assembly (Namibia)
SWAPO politicians
Year of birth missing (living people)